Tynowo  is a village in the administrative district of Gmina Markusy, within Elbląg County, Warmian-Masurian Voivodeship, in northern Poland.

Until 1945 the area was part of Germany (East Prussia).

References

Tynowo